Kainakary South is a village in Alappuzha district in the Indian state of Kerala.

Demographics
As of the 2001 Indian census, Kainakary South had a population of 16961 with 8218 males and 8743 females.

References

Villages in Alappuzha district